Franjo Dugan (11 September 1874 – 12 December 1948) was a prominent Croatian composer, organist and academic.

Biography 
Dugan received his first lessons in organ from Vatroslav Kolander, organist in Zagreb Cathedral. After graduating in Classical Gymnasium in Zagreb in 1892 he went to Hochmusikschule in Berlin, where he graduated in 1908. His professors were Robert Kahn and Max Bruch. By returning to Croatia, he became a professor in Osijek and Zagreb (1921-1941), where he taught music theory, composition and organs.

He was choirmaster of the several choirs (Kolo, Sloga, Oratory choir of the St. Mark's Church) and the organist of the St. Mark's Church. He was one of the founders of the Cecilian movement in Croatia, harmonizing a vast number of Croatian folk chants. He was a member of the Croatian Academy of Sciences and Arts.

Works 
He composed in a late romantical style, relying on the Baroque polyphony. He was partially inspired by Croatian folklore, especially sacral traditions of the Hrvatsko Zagorje, where he was born. He composed more than fifty vocal and instrumental (mostly for organs) music works.

Orchestral works 
 Uvertira (Overture), 1985
 Simfonijski andante (Symphonical andante), 1908

Works for organ 
Šest fughetta, 1893 
Dva preludija, 1893
Prélude et fugue in G-major, 1894.
Dvije fuge, in c-minor and f-minor, 1894
Kromatska fuga in c-minor, 1895. 
Toccata in g-minor, 1895.
Fantazija (Fantasy), 1895.
Preludij i fuga in H-major, 1908/09
Božićna predigra, 1942

Scientific papers 
Elementarna teorija muzike (Elementary Theory of Music), 1922.
Vježbe za zborno pjevanje 1923
Nauka o muzičkim formama, 1932
Nauka o instrumentima, 1936
Akustika (Acustics), 1943 
Nauk o glasbalima, 1944
Nauka o formama (left in manuscript)

References 

1874 births
1948 deaths
Croatian organists
Croatian composers
Members of the Croatian Academy of Sciences and Arts
Academic staff of the University of Osijek
Academic staff of the University of Zagreb